Maitotoxin (or MTX) is an extremely powerful biotoxin produced by Gambierdiscus toxicus, a dinoflagellate species. Maitotoxin has been shown to be more than one hundred thousand times more potent than VX nerve agent. Maitotoxin is so potent that it has been demonstrated that an intraperitoneal injection of 130 ng/kg was lethal in mice. Maitotoxin was named from the ciguateric fish Ctenochaetus striatus—called "maito" in Tahiti—from which maitotoxin was isolated for the first time. It was later shown that maitotoxin is actually produced by the dinoflagellate Gambierdiscus toxicus.

Mechanism of toxicity 
Maitotoxin activates extracellular calcium channels, leading to an increase in levels of cytosolic Ca2+ ions. The exact molecular target of maitotoxin is unknown, but it has been suggested that maitotoxin binds to the plasma membrane Ca2+ ATPase (PMCA) and turns it into an ion channel, similar to how palytoxin turns the Na+/K+-ATPase into an ion channel. Ultimately, a necroptosis cascade is activated, resulting in membrane blebbing and eventually cell lysis. Maitotoxin can indirectly activate calcium-binding proteases calpain-1 and calpain-2, contributing to necrosis. The toxicity of maitotoxin in mice is the highest for nonprotein toxins: the LD50 is 50 ng/kg.

Molecular structure 
The molecule itself is a system of 32 fused rings. It resembles large fatty acid chains and it is notable because it is one of the largest and most complex non-protein, non-polysaccharide molecules produced by any organism. Maitotoxin includes 32 ether rings, 22 methyl groups, 28 hydroxyl groups, and 2 sulfuric acid esters and has an amphipathic structure. Its structure was established through analysis using nuclear magnetic resonance at Tohoku University, Harvard University and the University of Tokyo in combination with mass spectrometry, and synthetic chemical methods. However, Andrew Gallimore and Jonathan Spencer have questioned the structure of maitotoxin at a single ring-junction (the J–K junction), based purely on biosynthetic considerations and their general model for marine polyether biogenesis. K. C. Nicolaou and Michael Frederick argue that despite this biosynthetic argument, the originally proposed structure could still be correct.
 The controversy has yet to be resolved.

Biosynthesis 
The molecule is produced in nature via a polyketide synthase pathway.

Total synthesis
Since 1996 the Nicolaou research group is involved in an effort to synthesise the molecule via total synthesis although the project is currently on hold due to a lack of funding.

See also
Palytoxin

References

Further reading 
 

Oxygen heterocycles
Marine neurotoxins
Ion channel toxins
Phycotoxins
Secondary alcohols
Alkene derivatives
Tetrahydropyrans
Organic sodium salts
Polyether toxins
Non-protein ion channel toxins
Calcium channel openers
Conjugated dienes
Sulfate esters
Heterocyclic compounds with 7 or more rings